The Ukrainian Second League (Druha Liha) is a professional football league in Ukraine which is part of the Professional Football League of Ukraine, a collective member of the Ukrainian Association of Football. As the third tier it was established in 1992 as the Transitional League and changed its name the next season. 

The league is lower than the Ukrainian First League (Persha Liha) and the lowest level of professional football competitions in the country. Since 1996 the league, after being merged with its lower tier (in 1992–1995 there was the Third League), consists of two main regions roughly north-west and south-east. The league's relegated teams lose their professional status and return to their regional associations.

Quick overview

First seasons
The third division of the Ukrainian championship originally was organized as the Transitional League due to numerous amateur clubs competing in it 15 out of 18. Out of the 1992 Transitional League the top clubs qualified for the 1992-93 Second League, while the bottom - the 1992-93 Transitional League, thus, creating an extra tier. Basically in the first seasons there was no promotion.

For the second season (1992-93) the league was officially organized as the Second League, while the name of transitional league was passed to the newly formed fourth division. Between seasons 1993 and 1995, there existed an auxiliary level (the Third League in 1994-95) of the football championship in Ukraine, lower than the Second League. From 1993 season to 1995 the Second League had a single group competition of over 20 clubs. During the 1996 reorganization, the auxiliary league was merged back to the Second League.

Creation of PFL
In 1996 Ukrainian football witnessed major changes in its organization as the Professional Football League of Ukraine was established. The new organization took control of the competition of former non-amateur clubs that were given attestation of professional clubs and included all the leagues of the Ukrainian championship. Concurrently with this the Third League was disbanded and all clubs that were not in the "relegation zone" were invited to join the Second League. The Second League in its turn was split into two groups. Only in the very first season the teams in this league were divided somewhat randomly, while later becoming more of regional sub-leagues. From 1997 the league was divided into three groups (Druha Liha A (west), B (south), and C (east)).

Further developments
In 1998 unlike other seasons the winners of the groups were not promoted automatically; instead a promotion-relegation tournament was organized involving four teams, three group winners and one of the weaker clubs of the First League. In 2006, the Ukrainian Professional Football League consolidated the Druha Liha due to a shortage of teams, and now the third level of professional football is divided into two groups once again (A - West and B - East).

Throughout its history the Second League has had some supplementary tournaments which include the Second League Cup as well as the Ukrainian Cup qualification tournament called the 2009–10 Ukrainian League Cup.

In summer of 2017 it was announced that the Second League is planned to be discontinued after the 2017-18 season.

Team withdrawals / critical situation
The league has suffered from chronic club withdrawals since its reorganization when the Ukrainian Third League was liquidated in 1995. The first club that withdrew in the middle of a season from Ukrainian championship was FC Elektron Romny which on 5 May 1994 withdrew from the Transitional League (Third League).

The reorganization of the competition in 1995 (merging Third and Second leagues) saw a number of clubs that discontinued their participation. At the start of season withdrew Temp Shepetivka which prior to that merged with Advis as well as Kosmos Pavlohrad, and five more clubs withdrew at winter break. Withdrawal of Temp led to a major disruption in competitions when Football Federation of Ukraine allowed to enter a quickly assembled team of amateur players for the First League to replace withdrawn Shepetivka club.

For a couple of years after that, there was relative stabilization, but not perfect with at least one club being withdrawn in a middle of ongoing season. In the 1998-99 season 10 teams quit the league before the season started. During the 2002-03 season Ukrainian football saw the withdrawal of a Top League club for the first time (Polihraftekhnika Oleksandriya). Due to those withdrawals the Second League suspended relegation of clubs since 2006-07, while there were some talks for the league to be discontinued. An idea surfaced during the 2009-10 season to merge the league with the First League breaking the last into several groups, but it was abandoned. During the same season a new tournament was organized to add some games to the calendar of the Second League clubs which had thinned away substantially, this was called the 2009–10 Ukrainian League Cup.

Organization
The calendar of competitions is adopted by the Central Council of PFL and the Executive Committee of FFU. The Bureau (Administration) of PFL regulates the league's operations and forms the Second League. All clubs of the PFL are obligated to own or sponsor a Children-Youth Sports School. All clubs of PFL are obligated to participate in the National Cup competition. A club of the Second League is also obligated to finance at least two junior teams from under the age of 10 to under the age of 19. The junior teams must participate either in regional competitions of the Children-Youth Football League of Ukraine. 

All stadiums must have a certificate of the State Commission in control of sports structures conditions. A club cannot play matches at its training sites nor stadiums not registered with PFL. Promotions of tobacco products at stadiums are prohibited. All stadiums must fly the flags of Ukraine, FFU, and PFL. Only accredited photo-correspondents and junior footballers who collect balls are allowed behind goalposts. 

The games are allowed to start not earlier than 12:00 and not later than 20:30. There must be at least a 48-hour break between two official games. Games can only be rescheduled if the following three criteria exist: a) unforeseen circumstances occur, b) delegation of four or more footballers to any national teams, or c) organization of direct tele-broadcasting.

Throughout history certain regions were represented only in certain groups, some competed in all groups. Among regions that were represented only in Group A are Lviv Oblast, Ternopil Oblast, Ivano-Frankivsk Oblast, Rivne Oblast, Zhytomyr Oblast, Chernivtsi Oblast, Zakarpattia Oblast, Volyn Oblast, only in Group B is just Autonomous Republic of Crimea, Group C existed for short time and had no exclusive region representation.

Such regions like Kyiv Oblast and City, Cherkasy Oblast, Kirovohrad Oblast, Chernihiv Oblast, Sumy Oblast, and Kharkiv Oblast at some point were represented in all three groups.

Such regions like Donetsk Oblast, Luhansk Oblast, Dnipropetrovsk Oblast, Zaporizhzhia Oblast, and Poltava Oblast were represented only in groups B and C.

Results by season
Promoted teams are indicated in bold.

Notes:
  indicates a championship title won in play-off game(s) between winners of groups.

Post-season play-offs
Post-season play-offs are not common feature of the Second League competition. Over the years there were several instances when clubs contested promotion or relegation berths. The first post-season feature consisted of a promotion mini-tournament that took place in July 1998 in Kyiv and Boryspil. It involved three group winners of the Second League and Bukovyna that placed 18th place in the First League. The tournament identified clubs which would qualify for the 1998–99 Ukrainian First League.

Championship game

Third-place play-offs

Promotion tournament
 1997–98: single round-robin tournament (FC Podillya Khmelnytskyi, FC Bukovyna Chernivtsi, FC Shakhtar-2 Donetsk, FC Krystal Kherson)

Relegation play-offs

Promotion play-offs

Inter-league rotations

Statistics

Top 10 winners

Notes:

League winners by region
In bold are shown active professional clubs

Conflict of succession
 In 1993–94 FC Boryspil won the title and was promoted, next season in the 1994–95 Ukrainian First League FC Boryspil changed its name to Borysfen Boryspil and in mid-season again to CSKA-Borysfen. As CSKA-Borysfen it won title again of the First League and was promoted again to the Premier League (Top League) for the 1995–96. At the same time in 1994–95 the original FC CSKA Kyiv won title of the Third League and after being promoted in 1995–96 title of the Second League. Upon conclusion of the 1995–96 in the Top League CSKA-Borysfen was swapped with the third tier CSKA Kyiv, while Borysfen Boryspil restarted from the Second League. 
 Similar situation took place in 2018 when People's Club Veres from Premier League was swapped with FC Lviv that previously played at amateur level. FC Lviv never in its club history gained promotion to the Ukrainian First League, yet spent two stints in the Ukrainian Premier League (first time as a successor of Hazovyk-Skala, second – after the swap with Veres).

All-time table
Top-20. All figures are correct through the 2020–21 season. Club status is current of the 2021–22 season:

Players
Among notable players of the league are its top scorers.

Managers

Stadiums

Most attended games
Most of the most attended games in the league since 1992 recorded at Zirka Stadium (Kropyvnytskyi), and since 1993–94 season FC Zirka Kropyvnytskyi all time attendance record on a single game until 2017–18 season, when Metalist Kharkiv phoenix club Metalist 1925 participated in the Druha Liha together with their original club rivals FC Dnipro and SC Dnipro-1. The record was set on in a Metalist 1925–Dnipro-1 match, which was attended by 14,521 people.

The most attended seasons were in the beginning of 1990s and the beginning of 2000s.

Short life-span clubs 

 FC Yalos Yalta
 FC Enerhiya Mykolaiv
 FC Komunalnyk Luhansk
 SC Dynamo Sloviansk
 MFC Zhytomyr
 FC Zhemchuzhyna Yalta
 FC Barsa Sumy
 SSSOR-Metalurh Zaporizhzhia
 FC Vodnyk Mykolaiv
 FC SKAD-Yalpuh Bolhrad
 FC Sportinvest Kryvyi Rih
 SC Skify Lviv
 FC Metalurh Komsomolske
 FC SKA-Orbita Lviv
 FC Real Odesa
 FC Berkut Bedevlia
 FC Sudnobudivnyk Mykolaiv (2016)
 MFC Oleksandria
 FC Fortuna Sharhorod
 SC Korosten
 FC SKA-Lotto Odesa
 FC Molniya Sieverodonetsk
 FC Palmira Odesa
 FC Adoms Kremenchuk
 FC Karlivka

External links
 Druha Liha at Official Site of the Professional Football league of Ukraine
 Interaction site for Druha liha
 Variety of championships

Notes

References

 

 
3
Sports leagues established in 1992
1992 establishments in Ukraine
Third level football leagues in Europe
Professional Football League of Ukraine
Professional sports leagues in Ukraine